The 1964 Villanova Wildcats football team represented the Villanova University during the 1964 NCAA University Division football season. The head coach was Alexander F. Bell, coaching his fifth season with the Wildcats. The team played their home games at Villanova Stadium in Villanova, Pennsylvania.

Schedule

References

Villanova
Villanova Wildcats football seasons
Villanova Wildcats football